Psychiatric genetics is a subfield of behavioral neurogenetics and behavioral genetics which studies the role of genetics in the development of mental disorders (such as alcoholism, schizophrenia, bipolar disorder, and autism). The basic principle behind psychiatric genetics is that genetic polymorphisms (as indicated by linkage to e.g. a single nucleotide polymorphism) are part of the causation of psychiatric disorders.

Psychiatric genetics is a somewhat new name for the old question, "Are behavioral and psychological conditions and deviations inherited?". The goal of psychiatric genetics is to better understand the causes of psychiatric disorders, to use that knowledge to improve treatment methods, and possibly also to develop personalized treatments based on genetic profiles (see pharmacogenomics). In other words, the goal is to transform parts of psychiatry into a neuroscience-based discipline.

Recent advances in molecular biology allowed for the identification of hundreds of common and rare genetic variations that contribute to psychiatric disorders.

History
Research on psychiatric genetics began in the late nineteenth century with Francis Galton (a founder of psychiatric genetics) who was motivated by the work of Charles Darwin and his concept of desegregation. These methods of study later improved due to the development of more advanced clinical, epidemiological, and biometrical research tools. Better research tools were the precursor to the ability to perform valid family, twin, and adoption studies. Researchers learned that genes influence how these disorders manifest and that they tend to aggregate in families.

Heritability and genetics
Most psychiatric disorders are highly heritable; the estimated heritability for bipolar disorder, schizophrenia, and autism (80% or higher) is much higher than that of diseases like breast cancer and Parkinson disease. Having a close family member affected by a mental illness is the largest known risk factor, to date. However, linkage analysis and genome-wide association studies have found few reproducible risk factors.

Heterogeneity is an important factor to consider when dealing with genetics. Two types of heterogeneity have been identified in association with psychiatric genetics: causal and clinical. Causal heterogeneity refers to a situation in which two or more causes can independently induce the same clinical syndrome. Clinical heterogeneity refers to when a single cause can lead to more than one clinical syndrome.

Several genetic risk factors have been found with the endophenotypes of psychiatric disorders, rather than with the diagnoses themselves. That is, the risk factors are associated with particular symptoms, not with the overall diagnosis. In psychiatry, endophenotypes are a way of objectively measuring certain internal processes  in a reliable way that is often lacking the diseases with which they are associated. They lie in the space between genes and disease process and allow for some understanding of the biology of psychiatric diseases.

A systematic comparative analysis of shared and unique genetic factors highlighted key gene sets and molecular processes underlying six major neuropsychiatric disorders: attention deficit hyperactivity disorder, anxiety disorders, autistic spectrum disorders, bipolar disorder, major depressive disorder, and schizophrenia. This may ultimately translate into improved diagnosis and treatment of these debilitating disorders.

Methodology
Linkage, association, and microarray studies generate raw material for findings in psychiatric genetics. 
Copy number variants have also been associated with psychiatric conditions.

Genetic Linkage studies attempt to find a correlation between the diagnosis and inheritance of certain alleles within families who have two or more ill relatives. An analysis of a linkage study uses a wide chromosomal region, whereas a genetic association study endeavors to identify a specific DNA polymorphism, which can be a deletion, inversion, or repletion of a sequence. Case-control association studies can be used as an exploratory tool for narrowing the area of interest after preliminary mapping of a gene by a linkage study.

Predictive genetic testing
One hope for future genetic testing is the ability to test for presymptomatic or prenatal illnesses. This information has the potential to improve the lives of those affected with certain illnesses, specifically those like schizophrenia. If possible to test for schizophrenia before the symptoms develop, proactive interventions could be developed, or even preventative treatments. In one study, 100% of patients with bipolar disorder indicated that they would probably take a genetic test to determine they were carrying a gene associated with the disorder, if such a test existed.

Ethical issues
Francis Galton studied both desirable and undesirable behavioral and mental properties to better examine the world of genetics. His research led to his proposal of a eugenic program of birth control. His goal was to decrease the frequency of the less desirable traits that occurred throughout the population. His ideas were pursued by psychiatrists in many countries such as the United States, Germany and Scandinavia.

Genotyping and its implications are still seen as ethically controversial by many people. The ELSI (Ethical, Legal, and Social Initiative), which is part of the Human Genome Project, was created with the aim of "foster[ing] basic and applied research on the ethical, legal and social implications of genetic and genomic research for individuals, families and communities.".

See also 
 Behavioural Genetics
neurogenetics
 International Behavioural and Neural Genetics Society (IBANGS)
 Gene-environment correlation
 Genetic predisposition
 Psychiatric Genetics (journal)
 Genes, Brain and Behavior (journal)
 Therapygenetics

References

External links 
 Behavioral Genetics Association
 IBANGS
 International Society of Psychiatric Genetics

Causes of mental disorders
Biology of bipolar disorder
Biological psychiatry
Behavioural genetics
Medical genetics